Light Perpetual is a historical novel with fantasy elements, written by Andrzej Sapkowski, the last part of the Hussite Trilogy. Its events take place in Bohemia, Silesia and Poland, during the time of Hussite Wars. Its action takes place from 1429 until the Battle of Lipany (fall of the Taborites). 

The trilogy is published by Orbit in the US in 2022 and Gollancz in the UK, who have purchased the rights, with the translator being David French, translator of several Sapkowski's Witcher books.

References and notes

External links 

Andrzej Sapkowski's official page

Polish historical novels
Polish fantasy novels
Fiction set in the 1430s
2006 novels
Novels set in the 15th century
21st-century Polish novels
Hussite Trilogy